Kashinagar is a Town, a NAC and also a Community Development Block Headquarter in Gajapati district in the Indian state of Odisha.

Demographics
 India census, Kashinagar had a population of 9782. Males constitute 49% of the population and females 51%. Kashinagar has an average literacy rate of 43%, lower than the national average of 59.5%: male literacy is 53%, and female literacy is 34%. In Kashinagar, 13% of the population is under 6 years of age. Road communication, medical, education level to be improved.

Transport
Road
Kashinagar has frequent connectivity of buses to Srikakulam, Tekkali, Hiramandalam, Palasa, Visakhapatnam, Anakapalle, Palakonda, Rajam, Paralakhemundi, Gunupur, Berhampur, Temburu, Mukhalingam.
Rail
Kashinagar can be reached by train via the Naupada-Gunupur branch line. The railway station is Kashinagar station of East Coast Railway Zone. It is connected to Howrah-Chennai main line. It has trains to Puri, Gunupur, Palasa-Kasibugga, Visakhapatnam.
Air
The closest airport is Visakhapatnam Airport situated 185 km from Kashinagar. Bhubaneswar Airport is 305 km away.

References

Cities and towns in Gajapati district